Srđan Lukić (Serbian Cyrillic: Cpђaн Лукић ; born December 1, 1981 in Jagodina) is a Serbian footballer currently playing in Serbian Superliga club FK Jagodina.

External sources
 Profile at Srbijafudbal.

1981 births
Living people
Sportspeople from Jagodina
Serbian footballers
FK Jagodina players
Serbian SuperLiga players
Association football defenders